Planckaert is a Belgian surname that may refer to
Andre Planckaert (born 1944), Belgian cyclist, brother of Jef 
Baptiste Planckaert (born 1988), Belgian cyclist 
Eddy Planckaert (born 1958), Belgian cyclist, brother of Walter and Willy
Edward Planckaert (born 1995), Belgian cyclist
Emiel Planckaert (born 1996), Belgian cyclist
Francesco Planckaert (born 1982), Belgian cyclist, son of Eddy
Jef Planckaert (1934–2007), Belgian cyclist, brother of Andre
Jo Planckaert (born 1970), Belgian cyclist, son on Willy
Walter Planckaert (born 1948), Belgian cyclist, brother of Eddy and Willy 
Willy Planckaert (born 1944), Belgian cyclist, brother of Eddy and Walter 

Dutch-language surnames